Association Sportive Maniema Union is a Congolese football club based in Kindu, Maniema province and currently playing in the Linafoot, the top level of professional football in DR Congo.

History
AS Maniema Union was founded in 2005 and they play at 10,000 capacity Stade Joseph Kabila Kabange.
 
Maniema competed in the CAF Confederation Cup in 2008, 2018 and 2019.

In February 2019, Les Verts et Noirs, appointed Guy Lusadisu as manager.

Honours
Coupe du Congo
 Winners (3): 2007, 2017, 2019

Maniema Provincial League
 Winners (1): 2006

Performance in CAF competitions
CAF Confederation Cup: 1 appearance
2008 – First Round
2018 – First Round
2019–20 – Preliminary Round

References

External links
Club profile - Soccerway.com

Kindu
Football clubs in the Democratic Republic of the Congo